John William Ogden (1862 – 23 March 1930) was a British trade unionist.

Ogden was born in Heywood, Greater Manchester, to Peter and Martha Ogden. He was baptised 14 September 1862. He began working half-time in a cotton mill at the age of eight and soon became active in his local trade union.  In 1891, he was elected as secretary of the Heywood, Castleton, Norden and District Weavers' Association, and through this he served on the council of the Amalgamated Weavers' Association.  He became president of the Amalgamated Weavers in 1910, and the following year was elected to the Parliamentary Committee of the Trades Union Congress (TUC).  He served as President of the TUC in 1918, and as its delegate to the American Federation of Labour in 1920.

Ogden joined the Independent Labour Party in the 1890s, and through this became active in the Labour Party, standing unsuccessfully for Sowerby at the 1918 and 1922 general elections.  He also served on Heywood Town Council and spent much of his spare time working with the Workers' Educational Association.

Ogden broke his leg around the end of 1929.  The leg was amputated, but he died three months later from resulting complications.

References

1862 births
1930 deaths
Presidents of the Amalgamated Weavers' Association
Independent Labour Party politicians
Labour Party (UK) parliamentary candidates
Members of the Parliamentary Committee of the Trades Union Congress
People from Heywood, Greater Manchester
Presidents of the Trades Union Congress
Date of birth missing